The 2002 National Hurling League, known for sponsorship reasons as the Allianz National Hurling League, was the 71st edition of the National Hurling League (NHL), an annual hurling competition for the GAA county teams. Kilkenny won the league, beating Cork in the final.

Structure
There are 12 teams in Division 1, divided into 1A and 1B. Each team plays all the others once, either home or away. Teams earn one point for a draw and two for a win.
The first-placed teams in 1A and 1B progress to the NHL semi-finals
The second- and third-placed teams in 1A and 1B progress to the quarter-finals
The fifth- and sixth-placed teams in 1A and 1B go into a relegation playoff.

There are 10 teams in Division 2, split into 2A and 2B.
The first- and second-placed teams in 2A and 2B progress to the Division 2 semi-finals
The fourth- and fifth-placed teams in 2A and 2B go into a relegation playoff.

There are 6 teams in Division 3. The top two play each other in the final, with the winner promoted. The bottom two teams play a relegation playoff.

There are 5 teams in Division 4. The top two play each other in the final, with the winner promoted.

Division 1

Division 1A

Group stage

Division 1B Table

Group stage

Relegation play-offs

Semi-finals

Final

Knock-out stage

Quarter-finals

Semi-finals

Final

Scoring statistics

Top scorers overall

Top scorers in a single game

Division 2

Division 2A

Division 2B

Results

Relegation play-offs

Knock-out stage

Division Three

Results

Relegation play-off

Knock-out stage

Division Four

Results

Knock-out stage

References

League
National Hurling League seasons